Michael or Mike McKee may refer to: 
 Michael McKee (politician)
 Michael McKee (broadcaster)
 Mike McKee (ice hockey)
 Mike McKee (rugby union)